The Journal of Earth System Science is a peer-reviewed scientific journal covering Earth system science. It was established in 1978 and is published by Springer Science+Business Media on behalf of the Indian Academy of Sciences. The editor-in-chief is N.V. Chalapathi Rao (Banaras Hindu University).

History
The journal was originally part of the Proceedings of the Indian Academy of Sciences. This journal was established in 1934, but in 1978 it was split into three different journals: Proceedings of the Indian Academy of Sciences (Earth and Planetary Sciences), Journal of Chemical Sciences, and Proceedings of the Indian Academy of Sciences - Mathematical Sciences. In 2005, Proceedings of the Indian Academy of Sciences (Earth and Planetary Sciences) was renamed as Journal of Earth System Science.

Abstracting and indexing
The journal is abstracted and indexed in:

According to the Journal Citation Reports, the journal has a 2021 impact factor of 1.912

References

External links

Springer Science+Business Media academic journals
Bimonthly journals
Publications established in 1978
English-language journals
Earth and atmospheric sciences journals
Earth system sciences